Jean-Marc Leclercq (also known as JoMo) is a French singer and Esperantist from Toulouse. The former singer of the group Les Rosemary’s Babies (or La Rozmariaj Beboj) who published two CDs with the French record production company Boucherie et Willins Production, he holds the Guinness Record for singing rock and traditional songs in over 22 languages.

He also plays with two groups, as Jomo and the Libertarians (JoMo kaj Liberecanoj), and occasionally with Jomo and the Mammoths (JoMo kaj la mamutoj).

Discs
Jomo slavumas (2006)
Hotel Desperado, de Esperanto Desperado (2004) – JoMo sings lead in the song "Ne permesas".JoMo Friponas! (2001)
 Ĉu vi volas danci?
 La Bambo!
 Lernu nun
 La simiulo
 Esperanto
 Sur la mar'
 Ĵambalajo
 Kisu min
 Al Durruti
 En la IJoKo
 Hej la nizoj!
 La virbovo kaj la luno
 Sub potenco de la leĝo
 Suno sunu!JoMo kaj Liberecanoj (1998) – part of Kolekto 2000 Al la barikadoj
 Maĥnovŝĉino
 La eskapinto
 Kajuna knabo
 La blondulineto
 Alumetujo
 Ĉeboksaro
 Kun ciVinilkosmo-kompil' 2 (1996) – He sings only in one song: Ali Bensali.Vinilkosmo-kompil' 1 (1995) – La Rozmariaj Beboj sing one song: Ĉe vi min forprenu.

 Books 
 Jean-Marc Leclercq, Sèrgi Javaloyès: Le gascon de poche. Assimil, Chennevières sur Marne 2004, .
 Jean-Marc Leclercq: Ucraïna. Institut d’Estudis Occitans, Puylaurens 2006, .
 Jean-Marc Leclercq: Diccionari de rimas. Per Noste, Orthez 2012, .

 External links 

Jean-Marc Leclercq official website
JoMo at MySpace
JoMo at Last.fm
Review (in Esperanto) of JoMo kaj Liberecanoj in MonatoReview (in Esperanto) of JoMo friponas el in MonatoHomepage of JoMo (kaj Liberecanoj) in MusicExpress – Short bio and mp3 files.
Radio 3ZZZ 2004-05-03 – This broadcast has the song En la IJKRadio 3ZZZ 2005-02-28 – This broadcast has the song Al Durruti''

Living people
Esperanto music
French male singers
French musicians
1961 births